The 2022–23 Winnipeg Jets season is the 24th season for the National Hockey League franchise that was established on June 25, 1997, and the 12th in Winnipeg, since the franchise relocated from Atlanta prior to the start of the 2011–12 NHL season. This will be the first season since the Jets moved from Atlanta that the team will not have a captain, as Blake Wheeler was stripped of his captaincy on September 16, 2022.

Standings

Divisional standings

Conference standings

Schedule and results

Preseason

|- style="background:#fcc;"
| 1 || September 25 || @ Edmonton Oilers || 0–4 ||  || Rittich || Rogers Place ||  || 0–1–0 ||  
|- style="background:#cfc;"
| 2 || September 27 || Ottawa Senators || 5–3 ||  || Hellebuyck || Canada Life Centre ||  || 1–1–0 || 
|- style="background:#cfc;"
| 3 || September 29 || @ Montreal Canadiens || 4–3 ||  || Rittich || Bell Centre ||  || 2–1–0  || 
|- style="background:#ffc;"
| 4 || October 1 || Edmonton Oilers || 2–3 || SO || Hellebuyck || Canada Life Centre ||  || 2–1–1 || 
|- style="background:#cfc;"
| 5 || October 5 || Calgary Flames || 5–0 ||  || Rittich || Canada Life Centre ||  || 3–1–1 || 
|- style="background:#cfc;"
| 6 || October 7 || @ Calgary Flames || 5–3 ||  || Hellebuyck || Scotiabank Saddledome ||  || 4–1–1 || 
|-

Regular season

|- style="background:#cfc;"
| 1 || October 14 || New York Rangers || 4–1 ||  || Hellebuyck || Canada Life Centre || 14,553 || 1–0–0 || 2 || 
|- style="background:#fcc;"
| 2 || October 17 || @ Dallas Stars || 1–4 ||  || Hellebuyck || American Airlines Center || 17,875 ||  1–1–0 || 2 || 
|- style="background:#cfc;"
| 3 || October 19 || @ Colorado Avalanche || 4–3 || OT || Hellebuyck || Ball Arena || 18,062 ||  2–1–0 || 4 || 
|- style="background:#fcc;"
| 4 || October 20 || @ Vegas Golden Knights || 2–5 ||  || Rittich || T-Mobile Arena || 17,777 || 2–2–0 || 4 || 
|- style="background:#fcc;"
| 5 || October 22 || Toronto Maple Leafs || 1–4 ||  || Hellebuyck  || Canada Life Centre  || 15,325  || 2–3–0 || 4 || 
|- style="background:#cfc;"
| 6 || October 24 || St. Louis Blues || 4–0 ||  || Hellebuyck  || Canada Life Centre  || 13,936  || 3–3–0 || 6 || 
|- style="background:#cfc;"
| 7 || October 27 || @ Los Angeles Kings || 6–4 ||  || Hellebuyck  || Crypto.com Arena  || 15,716 || 4–3–0 || 8 || 
|- style="background:#cfc;"
| 8 || October 28 || @ Arizona Coyotes   || 3–2 || OT || Rittich  || Mullett Arena  || 4,600  || 5–3–0 || 10 || 
|- style="background:#ffc;"
| 9 || October 30 || @ Vegas Golden Knights || 1–2 || OT || Hellebuyck || T-Mobile Arena || 17,824 || 5–3–1 || 11 || 

|- style= "background:#cfc;"
| 10 || November 3 || Montreal Canadiens || 3–2 || OT || Hellebuyck || Canada Life Centre || 13,729 || 6–3–1 || 13 || 
|- style="background:#cfc;"
| 11 || November 5 || Chicago Blackhawks || 4–0 ||  || Hellebuyck || Canada Life Centre || 13,210 || 7–3–1 || 15 ||  
|- style="background:#cfc;"
| 12 || November 8 || Dallas Stars || 5–1 ||  || Hellebuyck || Canada Life Centre || 13,847 || 8–3–1 || 17 || 
|- style="background:#fcc;"
| 13 || November 12 || @ Calgary Flames || 2–3 || || Hellebuyck || Scotiabank Saddledome || 18,501 || 8–4–1  || 17 || 
|- style="background:#cfc;"
| 14 || November 13 || @ Seattle Kraken || 3–2 || OT || Rittich || Climate Pledge Arena || 17,151 || 9–4–1 || 19 || 
|- style="background:#cfc;"
| 15 || November 17 || Anaheim Ducks || 3–2 ||  || Hellebuyck || Canada Life Centre || 14,278 || 10–4–1 || 21 || 
|- style="background:#fcc;"
| 16 || November 19 || Pittsburgh Penguins || 0–3 ||  || Hellebuyck || Canada Life Centre || 15,325 || 10–5–1 || 21 || 
|- style="background:#cfc;"
| 17 || November 21 || Carolina Hurricanes || 4–3 || OT || Rittich || Canada Life Centre || 13,346 || 11–5–1 || 23 || 
|- style="background:#fcc;"
| 18 || November 23 || @ Minnesota Wild || 1–6 ||  || Hellebuyck || Xcel Energy Center || 17,450 || 11–6–1 || 23 ||  
|- style="background:#cfc;"
| 19 || November 25 || @ Dallas Stars || 5–4 || OT || Hellebuyck || American Airlines Center || 18,532 || 12–6–1 || 25 || 
|- style="background:#cfc;"
| 20 || November 27 || @ Chicago Blackhawks || 7–2 ||  || Hellebuyck || United Center || 17,611 || 13–6–1 || 27 || 
|- style="background:#cfc;"
| 21 || November 29 || Colorado Avalanche || 5–0 ||  || Hellebuyck || Canada Life Centre || 13,510 || 14–6–1 || 29 || 

|- style="background:#fcc;"
| 22 || December 2 || Columbus Blue Jackets || 1–4 ||  || Rittich || Canada Life Centre || 13,240 || 14–7–1 || 29 || 
|- style="background:#cfc;"
| 23 || December 4 || Anaheim Ducks || 5–2 ||  || Hellebuyck || Canada Life Centre || 13,444 || 15–7–1 || 31 || 
|- style="background:#cfc;"
| 24 || December 6 || Florida Panthers || 5–2 ||  || Hellebuyck || Canada Life Centre || 13,426 || 16–7–1 || 33 || 
|- style="background:#cfc;"
| 25 || December 8 || @ St. Louis Blues || 5–2 ||  || Hellebuyck || Enterprise Center || 18,096 || 17–7–1 || 35 || 
|- style="background:#cfc;"
| 26 || December 9 || @ Chicago Blackhawks || 3–1 ||  || Rittich || United Center || 17,847 || 18–7–1 || 37 || 
|- style="background:#fcc;"
| 27 || December 11 || Washington Capitals || 2–5 ||  || Hellebuyck || Canada Life Centre || 14,096 || 18–8–1 || 37 || 
|- style="background:#fcc;"
| 28 || December 13 || Vegas Golden Knights || 5–6 ||  || Hellebuyck || Canada Life Centre || 13,102 || 18–9–1 || 37 || 
|- style="background:#cfc;"
| 29 || December 15 || Nashville Predators || 2–1 || OT || Hellebuyck || Canada Life Centre || 13,949 || 19–9–1 || 39 || 
|- style="background:#cfc;"
| 30 || December 17 || @ Vancouver Canucks || 5–1 ||  || Hellebuyck || Rogers Arena || 18,487 || 20–9–1 || 41 || 
|- style="background:#fcc;"
| 31 || December 18 || @ Seattle Kraken || 2–3 ||  || Rittich || Climate Pledge Arena || 17,151 || 20–10–1 || 41 || 
|- style="background:#cfc;"
| 32 || December 20 || Ottawa Senators || 5–1 ||  || Rittich || Canada Life Centre || 14,277 || 21–10–1 || 43 || 
|- style="background:#fcc;"
| 33 || December 22 || @ Boston Bruins || 2–3 ||  || Hellebuyck || TD Garden || 17,850 || 21–11–1 || 43 || 
|- style="background:#fcc;"
| 34 || December 23 || @ Washington Capitals || 1–4 ||  || Rittich || Capital One Arena || 18,573 || 21–12–1 || 43 || 
|- style="background:#fcc;"
| 35 || December 27 || Minnesota Wild || 1–4 ||  || Hellebuyck || Canada Life Centre || 15,325 || 21–13–1 || 43 || 
|- style="background:#cfc;"
| 36 || December 29 || Vancouver Canucks || 4–2 ||  || Hellebuyck || Canada Life Centre || 15,325 || 22–13–1 || 45 || 
|- style="background:#cfc;"
| 37 || December 31 || @ Edmonton Oilers || 2–1 ||  || Hellebuyck || Rogers Place || 18,347 || 23–13–1 || 47 || 

|- style="background:#cfc;"
| 38 || January 3 || Calgary Flames || 3–2 ||  || Hellebuyck || Canada Life Centre || 14,130 || 24–13–1 || 49 || 
|- style="background:#cfc;"
| 39 || January 6 || Tampa Bay Lightning || 4–2 ||  || Hellebuyck || Canada Life Centre || 15,325 || 25–13–1 || 51 || 
|- style="background:#cfc;"
| 40 || January 8 || Vancouver Canucks || 7–4 ||  || Rittich || Canada Life Centre || 14,206 || 26–13–1 || 53 || 
|- style="background:#fcc;"
| 41 || January 10 || @ Detroit Red Wings || 5–7 ||  || Hellebuyck || Little Caesars Arena || 19,075 || 26–14–1 || 53 || 
|- style="background:#cfc;"
| 42 || January 12 || @ Buffalo Sabres || 4–2 ||  || Hellebuyck || KeyBank Center || 15,208 || 27–14–1 || 55 || 
|- style="background:#cfc;"
| 43 || January 13 || @ Pittsburgh Penguins || 4–1 ||  || Rittich || PPG Paints Arena || 18,268 || 28–14–1 || 57 || 
|- style="background:#cfc;"
| 44 || January 15 || Arizona Coyotes || 2–1 ||  || Hellebuyck || Canada Life Centre || 13,949 || 29–14–1 || 59 || 
|- style="background:#fcc;"
| 45 || January 17 || @ Montreal Canadiens || 1–4 ||  || Hellebuyck || Bell Centre || 21,105 || 29–15–1 || 59 ||  
|- style="background:#fcc;"
| 46 || January 19 || @ Toronto Maple Leafs || 1–4 ||  || Hellebuyck || Scotiabank Arena || 18,644 || 29–16–1 || 59 || 
|- style="background:#cfc;"
| 47 || January 21 || @ Ottawa Senators || 5–1 ||  || Hellebuyck || Canadian Tire Centre || 19,042 || 30–16–1 || 61 || 
|- style="background:#cfc;"
| 48 || January 22 || @ Philadelphia Flyers || 5–3 ||  || Rittich || Wells Fargo Center || 15,441 || 31–16–1 || 63 || 
|- style="background:#fcc;"
| 49 || January 24 || @ Nashville Predators || 1–2 ||  || Hellebuyck || Bridgestone Arena || 17,159 || 31–17–1 || 63 || 
|- style="background:#fcc;"
| 50 || January 26 || Buffalo Sabres || 2–3 ||  || Hellebuyck || Canada Life Centre || 13,589 || 31–18–1 || 63 || 
|- style="background:#fcc;"
| 51 || January 28 || Philadelphia Flyers || 0–4 ||  || Hellebuyck || Canada Life Centre || 14,476 || 31–19–1 || 63 || 
|- style="background:#cfc;"
| 52 || January 30 || St. Louis Blues || 4–2 ||  || Hellebuyck || Canada Life Centre || 13,756 || 32–19–1 || 65 || 

|- style="background:#cfc;"
| 53 || February 11 || Chicago Blackhawks || 4–1 ||  || Hellebuyck || Canada Life Centre || 14,440 || 33–19–1 || 67 ||  
|- style="background:#cfc;"
| 54 || February 14 || Seattle Kraken || 3–2 || SO || Rittich || Canada Life Centre || 14,237 || 34–19–1 || 69 ||  
|- style="background:#fcc;"
| 55 || February 16 || @ Columbus Blue Jackets || 1–3 ||  || Rittich || Nationwide Arena || 16,032 || 34–20–1 || 69 ||  
|- style="background:#fcc;"
| 56 || February 19 || @ New Jersey Devils || 2–4 ||  || Hellebuyck || Prudential Center || 16,514 || 34–21–1 || 69 ||  
|- style="background:#cfc;"
| 57 || February 20 || @ New York Rangers || 4–1 ||  || Hellebuyck || Madison Square Garden || 18,006 || 35–21–1 || 71 || 
|- style="background:#fcc;"
| 58 || February 22 || @ New York Islanders || 1–2 ||  || Hellebuyck || UBS Arena || 17,255 || 35–22–1 || 71 || 
|- style="background:#fcc;"
| 59 || February 24 || Colorado Avalanche || 1–5 ||  || Hellebuyck || Canada Life Centre || 14,157 || 35–23–1 || 71 ||  
|- style="background:#fcc;"
| 60 || February 26 || New York Islanders || 0–4 ||  || Rittich || Canada Life Centre || 13,797 || 35–24–1 || 71 ||  
|- style="background:#ffc;"
| 61 || February 28 || Los Angeles Kings || 5–6 || SO || Hellebuyck || Canada Life Centre || 13,203 || 35–24–2 || 72 ||  

|- style="background:#fcc;"
| 62 || March 3 || @ Edmonton Oilers || 3–6 ||  || Hellebuyck || Rogers Place || 18,347 || 35–25–2 || 72 || 
|- style="background:#cfc;"
| 63 || March 4 || Edmonton Oilers || 7–5 ||  || Hellebuyck || Canada Life Centre || 15,324 || 36–25–2 || 74 || 
|- style="background:#ffc;"
| 64 || March 6 || San Jose Sharks || 2–3 || OT || Rittich || Canada Life Centre || 13,026 || 36–25–3 || 75 || 
|- style="background:#fcc;"
| 65 || March 8 || Minnesota Wild || 2–4 ||  || Hellebuyck || Canada Life Centre || 13,148 || 36–26–3 || 75 || 
|- style="background:#cfc;"
| 66 || March 11 || @ Florida Panthers || 5–4 || OT ||  Hellebuyck || FLA Live Arena || 16,340 || 37–26–3 || 77 || 
|- style="background:#cfc;"
| 67 || March 12 || @ Tampa Bay Lightning || 3–2 ||  || Hellebuyck || Amalie Arena || 19,092 || 38–26–3 || 79 || 
|- style="background:#fcc;"
| 68 || March 14 || @ Carolina Hurricanes || 3–5 ||  || Rittich || PNC Arena || 18,680 || 38–27–3 || 79 || 
|- style="background:#fcc;"
| 69 || March 16 || Boston Bruins || 0–3 ||  || Hellebuyck || Canada Life Centre ||  || 38–28–3 || 79 || 
|- style="background:#cfc;"
| 70 || March 18 || @ Nashville Predators || 3–2 || OT || Hellebuyck || Bridgestone Arena ||  || 39–28–3 || 81 || 
|- style="background:#;"
| 71 || March 19 || @ St. Louis Blues || – ||  ||  || Enterprise Center ||  ||  ||  || 
|- style="background:#;"
| 72 || March 21 || Arizona Coyotes || – ||  ||  || Canada Life Centre ||  ||  ||  || 
|- style="background:#;"
| 73 || March 23 || @ Anaheim Ducks || – ||  ||  || Honda Center ||  ||  ||  || 
|- style="background:#;"
| 74 || March 25 || @ Los Angeles Kings || – ||  ||  || Crypto.com Arena ||  ||  ||  || 
|- style="background:#;"
| 75 || March 28 || @ San Jose Sharks || – ||  ||  || SAP Center ||  ||  ||  || 
|- style="background:#;"
| 76 || March 31 || Detroit Red Wings || – ||  ||  || Canada Life Centre ||  ||  ||  || 

|- style="background:#;"
| 77 || April 2 || New Jersey Devils || – ||  ||  || Canada Life Centre ||  ||  ||  || 
|- style="background:#;"
| 78 || April 5 || Calgary Flames || – ||  ||  || Canada Life Centre ||  ||  ||  || 
|- style="background:#;"
| 79 || April 8 || Nashville Predators || – ||  ||  || Canada Life Centre ||  ||  ||  || 
|- style="background:#;"
| 80 || April 10 || San Jose Sharks || – ||  ||  || Canada Life Centre ||  ||  ||  || 
|- style="background:#;"
| 81 || April 11 || @ Minnesota Wild || – ||  ||  || Xcel Energy Center ||  ||  ||  || 
|- style="background:#;"
| 82 || April 13 || @ Colorado Avalanche || – ||  ||  || Ball Arena ||  ||  ||  || 

|-
| 2022–23 schedule

Player statistics
updated to game played March 11, 2023

Skaters

Goaltenders

†Denotes player spent time with another team before joining the Jets. Stats reflect time with the Jets only.
‡Denotes player was traded mid-season. Stats reflect time with the Jets only.

Roster

Transactions
The Jets have been involved in the following transactions during the 2022–23 season.

Key:

 Contract is entry-level.
 Contract initially takes effect in the 2023–24 season.

Trades

Notes:

Players acquired

Players lost

Signings

Draft picks

Below are the Winnipeg Jets' selections at the 2022 NHL Entry Draft, which was held on July 7 to 8, 2022, at Bell Centre in Montreal.

References

Winnipeg Jets seasons
Winnipeg Jets